The Azerbaijani Social Democratic Party (ASDP) is an Azerbaijani secularist and a social democratic political party led by the former President of Azerbaijan Ayaz Mutalibov. At the elections held on 5 November 2000 and 7 January 2001, the party won less than 1% of popular vote and failed to gain seats in the parliament. It promotes secularism and social democracy.

See also
:Category:Azerbaijani Social Democratic Party politicians

1989 establishments in Azerbaijan
Full member parties of the Socialist International
Political parties established in 1989
Political parties in Azerbaijan
Social democratic parties in Asia
Socialism in Azerbaijan
Social democratic parties in Azerbaijan
Social democratic parties in the Soviet Union